Pimelea cinerea is a species of flowering plant in the family Thymelaeaceae and is endemic to Tasmania. It is a slender shrub with more or less elliptic leaves, and heads of white flowers surrounded by leaves.

Description
Flowering occurs from November to January.

Taxonomy and naming
Pimelea cinerea was first formally described in 1810 by Robert  Brown in his book Prodromus Florae Novae Hollandiae et Insulae Van Diemen. The specific epithet (cinerea) means "ash-coloured" or "grey".

Distribution and habitat

References

cinerea
Malvales of Australia
Flora of Tasmania
Plants described in 1810
Taxa named by Robert Brown (botanist, born 1773)